Shansiodontidae is a family of dicynodont therapsids.

References

Kannemeyeriiformes
Triassic first appearances
Triassic extinctions
Prehistoric therapsid families